Liolaemus curis, Nuñez's tree iguana, is a species of lizard in the family Liolaemidae. It is endemic to Chile.

References

curis
Lizards of South America
Endemic fauna of Chile
Reptiles of Chile
Reptiles described in 1985
Taxonomy articles created by Polbot